is a national university in Kōchi, Kōchi Prefecture, Japan. The predecessors Toya-gakusha (later Kochi Normal School) was founded in 1874, Kochi Higher School in 1922, Kochi prefecture Teacher Training Institute for Agriculture Associated School in 1923, and it was chartered as a university in 1949.

Faculties
Faculty of Humanities and Social Sciences
Faculty of Education
Faculty of Science and Technology 
Medical School
Faculty of Agriculture and Marine Science
Faculty of Regional Collaboration

Graduate Schools
Graduate School of Integrated Arts and Sciences
Master's Courses
Humanities and Social Sciences Program
Education Program 
Science Program
Medical Science Program
Nursing Science Program
Agricultural Science Program
Kuroshio Integrated Science (Sub-Major)
Plant Health Care Science (Sub-Major)
Doctoral Courses
Applied Science Program
Medicine Program
Kuroshio Science Program
The United Graduate School of Agricultural Sciences, Ehime University

External links
 Official website

Educational institutions established in 1922
Japanese national universities
Universities and colleges in Kōchi Prefecture
1922 establishments in Japan